The 1927 Georgia vs. Yale football game, played October 8, 1927, was a college football game between the Georgia Bulldogs and Yale Bulldogs at the Yale Bowl in New Haven, Connecticut. Both teams were picked by some selectors as national champion. Georgia won 14 to 10. Georgia was known as the "dream and wonder team" and it was the school's first defeat of northern power Yale which propelled the team in the national spotlight. Georgia had traveled to Yale each of the previous four seasons, each time coming up with a loss, and were outscored by a combined 101 to 13.

Walter Eckersall noted the progress of southern football as he reflected on Georgia's victory over Yale; "Old Eli, with its running attack, could do nothing against Georgia, which is represented by two of the finest ends in the country. Nash and Shiver would be valuable assets on any football team." "Georgia downed Yale on aggressiveness and the ability to carry on a successful forward pass attack. Costly fumbles and poor generalship by Yale were quickly converted into Georgia opportunities. Purdue upset Harvard the same week.

References

1927 college football season
vs. Georgia 1927
vs. Yale 1927
October 1927 sports events
1927 in sports in Connecticut